Melita Stadium is a multi-use stadium in Sydney, Australia. It is mainly used for football and is the home ground for Parramatta FC team and the Parramatta Ladyhawks Women's Super League team. The stadium has a capacity of 10,000 people.

Melita Stadium is home to the Maltese national rugby league team.

References

External links
Official Website of Parramatta FC
Austadiums page

Soccer venues in Sydney
Rugby league stadiums in Australia
Rugby union stadiums in Australia
Sports venues in Sydney
Parramatta FC